Karikkatt Marathu Kuttikrishna Marar (14 June 1900 – 6 April 1973) was an Indian essayist and literary critic of Malayalam literature. He was known for Bharathaparyaadanam, a critical study of the Mahabharata, which is counted by many among the most influential books in Malayalam and was a recipient of the Sahitya Akademi Award and Kerala Sahitya Akademi Award.

Biography 
Kuttikrishna Marar was born on 14 June 1900 in Triprangode, in Malappuram district of the south Indian state of Kerala to Karikkatt Marathu Krishna Marar and Lakshmikutty Marasyar. He learnt percussion, which was the family profession, along with drawing as early education but his life took a turn when he joined Sree Neelakanta Government Sanskrit College Pattambi where he had the opportunity to study under two known teachers, Punnassery Nambi and Shambu Sharma. Subsequently, he passed the Sahityashiromani examination and started his career as Sahithyacharya at the Kerala Kalamandalam where he worked alongside Vallathol Narayana Menon for 15 years, during which period, he published many of his writings. From 1938 to 1961 he was the proofreader of the Malayalam daily newspaper, Mathrubhumi.

Marar married Kizhakkemarath Narayanikutty Marasyar in 1924 and the couple had seven children in that four sons and three daughters. Towards the later part of his life, he was more inclined to spiritual pursuits. He died on 6 April 1973, at the age of 72.

Literary career 
Kuttikrishna Marar was a harsh critic of literary indiscretions. His work, Bharathaparyadanam, a critical study of the Mahabharata is considered by many as a seminal work and is a part of the Central Board of Secondary Education syllabus. Another of his important works is Kala Jeevitham Thanne (Art is Life itself), which won him Kerala Sahitya Akademi Award, Kendra Sahitya Akademi Award and M. P. Paul Prize. Malayala Shaili, another of his notable works, is one of the most authentic treatises on proper Malayalam usage. Sahithyasallapam, Danthagopuram and Kaivilakku (collections of literary criticism) are some of his other works on literary criticism. Besides, he has also published over 19 collections of essays on literary criticism.

Awards and honours 
In 1967, Marar received Sahithya Ratnam award from Pattambi Sree Neelakanda Sanskrit College and Sahithya Nipunan award from Government Sanskrit College, Tripunithura. Sahitya Akademi awarded him their annual award in 1966, for his work, Kala Jeevitham Thanne. He received another award for the same work the same year, the inaugural Kerala Sahitya Akademi Award for Literary Criticism. He received the M. P. Paul Prize also in 1966. His life and work has been documented by many writers and Marar Lavanyabhavathinte Yukthi Shilpam, one such work written by M. Thomas Mathew was selected for Vayalar Award in 2009.

Bibliography

Literary criticism

Poems and plays

Children's literature

Translations by Marar

Memoirs

Translations into English

References

External links
 

1900 births
1973 deaths
Indian male essayists
Malayalam-language writers
Indian Sanskrit scholars
Translators of Kalidasa
Recipients of the Sahitya Akademi Award in Malayalam
20th-century Indian translators
20th-century Indian essayists
People from Palakkad district
Writers from Kerala
Malayalam literary critics
Indian literary critics